The 2017–18 Cupa României was the 80th season of the annual Romanian primary football knockout tournament. The winner, Universitatea Craiova, qualified for the third qualifying round of the 2018–19 UEFA Europa League.

Participating clubs
The following 124 teams qualified for the competition:

Preliminary rounds

The first rounds, and any preliminaries, are organised by the Regional Leagues.

First round
All matches were played on 9 August 2017.

|colspan="3" style="background-color:#97DEFF"|9 August 2017

|}

Second round
All matches were played on 22 August 2017.

|colspan="3" style="background-color:#97DEFF"|22 August 2017

|}

Third round
All matches were played on 12 and 13 September 2017.

|colspan="3" style="background-color:#97DEFF"|12 September 2017

|-
|colspan="3" style="background-color:#97DEFF"|13 September 2017

|}

Fourth round
All matches were played on 3 and 4 October 2017.

|colspan="3" style="background-color:#97DEFF"|3 October 2017

|-
|colspan="3" style="background-color:#97DEFF"|4 October 2017

|}

Round of 32
The matches were played on 24, 25 and 26 October 2017.

Round of 16
The matches were played on 28, 29 and 30 November 2017.

Quarter-finals
The matches were played on 27, 1 March, 6 March and 13 March 2018.

Semi-finals
The semi-final matches are played in a round-trip system. The first legs were played on 17 and 19 April 2018 and the second legs were played on 9 May 2018.

|}

1st leg

2nd leg

Final

References

 
Romania
Cupa României seasons